This article details the international fixtures and results of the United Arab Emirates national football team.

Fixtures and results (2020–present)

2023

2022

2021

2020

Results (2010–2019)

2019

2018

2017

2016

2015

2014

2013

2012

2011

2010

Results (2000–2009)

2009

2008

2007

2006

Notes

External links
United Arab Emirates – Fixtures & Results at FIFA.com
United Arab Emirates – World football elo ratings at EloRatings.net  (Includes past fixtures & results)